Yayasan Cipta Cara Padu (YCCP) was established in 2008 to sustain donor assisted programs implemented by Johns Hopkins Bloomberg School of Public Health Center for Communication Programs in Indonesia in the past 15 years.

YCCP has expertise and hands-on experience in a wide spectrum of health and environmental issues including water, sanitation and hygiene, HIV/AIDS, safe motherhood, child survival, family planning (FP), reproductive health (RH), infectious disease, and environmental conservation.

 Behavior change communication campaigns are implemented to increase awareness and build better knowledge and understanding about health practices.
 Community mobilization activities aim to empower community members to organize themselves and identify issues/problems and initiate activities to resolve them.
 Advocacy is conducted to influence and motivate policy makers to support improved health service initiatives, as evidenced by increased provision of program funding and a cohesive environment.
 Social marketing, the application of marketing techniques for programs with social benefits as well as social research implementation and results analysis for social program planning.

Activities

Currently, the YCCP team is managing: The Advance Family Planning (AFP) initiative, funded by the Gates Institute; the Improving Contraceptive Method Mix (ICMM), funded by USAID and AUSAID; and the High Five program, funded by USAID.

References

Organizations established in 2008
Organizations based in Jakarta
Family planning
Foundations based in Indonesia